Robert Thomas Bigelow (born May 12, 1944) is an American businessman. He owns the hotel chain Budget Suites of America and is the founder of Bigelow Aerospace.
In 2011, Forbes estimated his net worth to be $700 million.

Bigelow has provided financial support for investigations of UFOs and parapsychological topics, including the continuation of consciousness after death.

Early life and education
Bigelow grew up in Las Vegas, Nevada, attended Highland Elementary School, and was first exposed to science through a number of the nuclear weapons tests conducted about 70 miles northwest of the city.

At age 12, Bigelow decided that his future lay in space travel. Despite his limitations in mathematics, he resolved to choose a career that would make him rich enough that, one day, he could hire the scientific expertise required to launch his own space program.

He enrolled in the University of Nevada, Reno, in 1962 to study banking and real estate, and he graduated from Arizona State University in 1967.

Career

Real estate
From the late 1960s through the 1990s, Bigelow developed commercial real estate hotels, motels and apartments.

In his real estate career, Bigelow built approximately 15,000 units and purchased another 8,000. For most of his career, "he held on to almost everything he bought, but ... eventually unload much of his housing stock in the boom years immediately before the 2008 crash". In 2013, Bigelow reflected on this: "People just really wanted to throw money away, so that was lucky."

Aerospace
In 1999, Bigelow founded Bigelow Aerospace.

Bigelow had indicated he planned to spend up to US$500 million to develop the first commercial space station with a goal of the station costing 33% of the US$1.5 billion that NASA expended on a single Space Shuttle mission. Bigelow Aerospace has launched two experimental space modules, Genesis I in 2006 and Genesis II in 2007, and had planned for full-scale space habitats to be used as orbital hotels, research labs and factories.

In 2013, Bigelow indicated that the reason he went into the commercial real estate business was to obtain the requisite resources to be able to fund a team developing space destinations. In October 2017, Bigelow announced that he planned to put an inflatable "space hotel" into orbit by 2022. The plan is part of partnership with United Launch Alliance, and the project is estimated to cost US$2.3 billion in total. The cost of a 3-day stay in this spatial hotel is estimated at 5 million dollars.

In April 2016, Bigelow's BEAM module was launched to the International Space Station on the eighth SpaceX cargo resupply mission.

In March 2020, Bigelow Aerospace laid off all 88 members of staff and halted operations after over 20 years of business, in a move that was partly caused by the coronavirus pandemic.

In March 2021, he sued NASA for US$1.05 million, alleging he was not paid according to contract for product testing and development.

Anomalies research
In 1995, Bigelow founded the National Institute for Discovery Science to fund the research and study of various fringe sciences and paranormal topics, most notably ufology. The organization researched cattle mutilation and black triangle reports, ultimately attributing the latter to secretive advanced aircraft operated by the military. The institute was disbanded in 2004.

In 1996, Bigelow purchased Skinwalker Ranch, a 512-acre cattle ranch located in Utah that is the site of purported paranormal phenomena, such as inter-dimensional shape-shifters.

In December 2017, Bigelow was reported by the New York Times to have urged Senator Harry Reid to initiate what became the Advanced Aerospace Threat Identification Program, a government study which operated from 2007 to 2012 tasked with the study of UFOs.  According to the New York Times, Bigelow said he was “absolutely convinced” that extraterrestrial life exists and that extraterrestrials have visited Earth.

Consciousness studies
In June 2020, Bigelow founded the Bigelow Institute for Consciousness Studies to support investigations into life after death. In January 2021, he put up an award of US$1 million for anyone who could demonstrate the existence of a life after death.

Personal life 
Bigelow was married to Diane Mona Bigelow for 55 years until her death in 2020.

Political contributions
Bigelow has made political donations to conservative Republican candidates. In July 2022, he donated $10 million to Florida Republican Governor Ron DeSantis, which was the single biggest donation of his re-election bid. Bigelow has contributed over $25 million to groups and causes supporting Joe Lombardo's candidacy for governor of Nevada. Campaign finance experts believe this may be the most a single donor has spent on a statewide race in modern history.

References

Further reading

External links
Bigelow Aerospace website
 Bigelow Institute

Place of birth missing (living people)
1944 births
20th-century American businesspeople
21st-century American businesspeople
American aerospace businesspeople
American chief executives of travel and tourism industry companies
American company founders
American hoteliers
American real estate businesspeople
Arizona State University alumni
Bigelow Aerospace
Living people
Businesspeople from Las Vegas
University of Nevada, Reno alumni